John Albert "Monster" Mathews (born in Wichita, Kansas) is an American former competitive rower, U.S. Olympian and Pan American.  He was a member of the 1975 World Championship Team to Nottingham, England, where he placed fifth in the coxed pair.  Mathews was also a member of the U.S. Olympic Team competing in the 1976 Summer Olympics in Montreal in the men's coxed pair event.
 
John Mathews is a Worcester Polytechnic Institute alum and is the only Olympian from WPI in its history. He rowed on its crew team from 1972 to 1974. His Varsity boat won the Worcester City Championships in 1973 and 1974  on Lake Quinsigamond.

Joining Vesper Boat Club in 1974, Mathews won U.S. National Championships in the coxed four in 1975 and the coxed pair in 1975 and 1976, as well as winning in the coxed four at the Canadian Henley Royal Regatta in 1974 He won Head of the Charles Boston, MA first place medals on the same day in the elite eight (Boston Globe Trophy) and elite four with coxswain (Schaefer Trophy) in 1975 and repeating the wins again in 1976 for Vesper Boat Club, Philadelphia, under coach Dietrich Rose.

Mathews coxed pair placed second in 1975 in the Lucerne International Regatta, the first time on the world stage that he and Darrell Vreugdenhill, along with coxswain Kenneth Dreyfus rowed the pair with together. Later that fall, they won a gold medal in the coxed pair event at the 1975 Pan American Games at Mexico City.
In the Spring of 1976, his pair with coxswain trained at the Ratzeburger Ruderclub in Ratzeburg, GE, the center for elite rowing in West Germany, under Karl Adam. At the International Wedau Regatta in Duisburg, GE, they won the coxed pair event and received a medal of the seal of Duisburg in their event.

In 1978, Mathews joined the Boston Rugby Club as a second row forward, and also played for the Hartford Wanderers Rugby Club. He joined the U.S. Naval Reserves in 1986, reaching the rank of Lieutenant Commander in the Civil Engineer Corps, serving in Naval Mobile Construction Battalions 12, 13, and 27 (the Seabees), as well as the 7th Naval Construction Regiment, and as a Contingency Engineer for U.S. European Command Headquarters in Stuttgart, GE.

As a member of Yankee Rowing Club and in 2007 won the Blackburn Challenge, Gloucester, MA, rowing in the Touring Class Single, Sliding Seat in a 20+ mile open ocean race circumnavigating Cape Ann. He worked at the University of Massachusetts Amherst in Amherst, MA as a Facility Manager and an Associate Faculty member, where he retired in 2019.

Rowing

Representing the United States

Representing Vesper Boat Club, Philadelphia

References

External links
 

Living people
Rowers at the 1976 Summer Olympics
1951 births
Olympic rowers of the United States
American male rowers
Pan American Games medalists in rowing
Pan American Games gold medalists for the United States
Rowers at the 1975 Pan American Games
Medalists at the 1975 Pan American Games